Rivalry (also known as Medico condotto) is a 1953 Italian melodrama film. Written, produced and overseen by Roberto Rossellini, it marked the directorial debut of Giuliano Biagetti. The film was shot and set in Castiglione della Pescaia.

Production 
The film is attributable to the trend of sentimental melodramas, commonly called tearjerking, at the time very popular among the Italian public, although frowned upon by contemporary film critics (who only in the seventies revalued these films, specifically coining the term neorealism of appendix).

Cast 
Marco Vicario as Dr. Roberto Ferrero
Franca Marzi as Franca
Giovanna Ralli as  Luisa
Saro Urzì as  The Mayor
Edoardo Toniolo as  Mr. Fauci
Pietro Tordi as  Dr. Silvestri

References

External links

1953 films
1953 drama films
Italian drama films
Films directed by Giuliano Biagetti
Films set in Tuscany
Films shot in Tuscany
Roberto Rossellini
1953 directorial debut films
Italian black-and-white films
Melodrama films
1950s Italian films